Manfred Schaefer (born 12 February 1943) is a former association football defender. At club level he won titles with St. George Budapest. With the Australian national team he participated in the 1974 World Cup in his native Germany. As coach he was several times runner-up in the Australian National Soccer League with various clubs.

Biography
Schaefer was born in the East Prussian town of Pillau, Germany (now Baltiysk, Russia), near Königsberg (now Kaliningrad). 
In the dying days of World War II his family fled westward to Bremen. In 1954 the family emigrated with Manfred, by then aged 11, to Australia. Schaefer was a milkman, a job that required him to deliver fresh milk to households in the suburbs every morning, and to which his extraordinary physical fitness was often attributed.

The rugged central defender started his football career in 1960 with Blacktown in west Sydney, playing in the second division of New South Wales. In 1963 he joined first division Budapest Club, which was renamed St. George-Budapest SC by 1965. There he played until 1975 alongside other great Australian football stars of the era, such as Attila Abonyi and Johnny Warren, winning the state championship in 1967, 1971, 1974 and 1975, the highest possible achievement in Australian football at the time in the absence of a national competition. He won the state cup, then known as the Ampol Cup, in 1967, 1972 and 1975; and in 1964 and 1972, the Federation Cup of New South Wales. The titles of 1975 he won as player-coach.

Schaefer's debut for the national side occurred on 5 November 1967, in a 5–3 victory over New Zealand, during the Vietnam National Day Tournament in Saigon (now Ho Chi Minh City). He played 73 times in the colours of Australia, 49 times in official international matches in which he scored one goal. His last three matches for Australia were 1974 World Cup, against East Germany, West Germany and Chile. He also represented New South Wales in interstate matches.

In 1975, he began his coaching career at St. George-Budapest, where he remained until 1977. He then coached Sydney Olympic in the national championship from 1982 to 1986, where he was twice runner-up; Brunswick Juventus in the state league of Victoria in 1988; APIA Leichhardt from 1989 to 1991; Sydney United from 1992 to 1994; Leichhardt Tigers in 1995; Marconi Fairfield from 1995 until 1997, leading the team into the grand final of the national championship against the Melbourne Knights FC, where they lost 1:2; Adelaide Sharks from 1998 to 1999; and Parramatta Power from 2002 to 2004, where he served as assistant coach, and was runner-up in the national championship of 2004.

1999 Schaefer was an inaugural inductee into the Australian Soccer Hall of Fame. He was invited to the draw for the preliminary qualifying matches for the 2006 FIFA World Cup.

Schaefer Terrace in the Sydney suburb of Glenwood is named after him. His daughter Kim Schaefer played a couple of non-A international matches for the Australia women's national soccer team.

References

External links 
 "Manfred Schaefer", FIFA.com (per 27 July 2012)
 "Australian Player Database", OzFootball, (per 27 July 2012)

1943 births
Living people
People from Pillau
German emigrants to Australia
Australian soccer players
Australia international soccer players
1974 FIFA World Cup players
Association football defenders
Marconi Stallions FC managers
Australian soccer coaches
Sydney United 58 FC managers